Kalyan Banerjee may refer to:

 Kalyan Banerjee (Rotary International) (born 1942), president of Rotary International
 Kalyan Banerjee (politician) (born 1957), Indian politician
 Kalyan Banerjee (homoeopath) (born 1949), Indian homoeopath